Abkhazia, officially the Republic of Abkhazia, is a partially recognised state in the South Caucasus, at the intersection of Eastern Europe and Western Asia. It lies on the eastern coast of the Black Sea in northwestern Georgia. It is recognised by most countries as part of the latter. Its capital and largest city is Sukhumi.

The status of Abkhazia is a central issue of the Abkhaz–Georgian conflict and Georgia–Russia relations. Abkhazia is recognised as an independent state by Russia, Venezuela, Nicaragua, Nauru, and Syria. While Georgia lacks control over Abkhazia, the Georgian government and most United Nations member states consider Abkhazia legally a part of Georgia, with Georgia maintaining an official government-in-exile.

The region had autonomy within Soviet Georgia at the time when the Soviet Union began to disintegrate in the late 1980s. Simmering ethnic tensions between the Abkhaz—the region's titular ethnicity—and Georgians—the largest single ethnic group at that time—culminated in the 1992–1993 War in Abkhazia, which resulted in Georgia's loss of control over most of Abkhazia and the ethnic cleansing of Georgians from Abkhazia.

Despite a 1994 ceasefire agreement and years of negotiations, the dispute remains unresolved. The long-term presence of a United Nations Observer Mission and a Russian-led Commonwealth of Independent States peacekeeping force failed to prevent the flare-up of violence on several occasions. In August 2008, Abkhaz and Russian forces fought a war against Georgian forces, which led to the formal recognition of Abkhazia by Russia, the annulment of the 1994 ceasefire agreement and the termination of the UN mission. On 28 August 2008, the Parliament of Georgia declared Abkhazia a Russian-occupied territory, a position shared by most United Nations member states.

Name
In Abkhazia (  or  ), officially the Republic of Abkhazia, locals call their homeland  It is popularly etymologised as "a land/country of the soul", yet literally meaning "a country of mortals (mortal beings)". It possibly first appeared in the seventh century in an Armenian text as Psin(oun), perhaps referring to the ancient Apsilians. The term "Apkhazeti" first appeared in the Georgian annals, which is of Mingrelian origin "Apkha" meaning back or shoulder, gave rise to the name Abkhazia. It was used to denote Abasgia proper and entire Western Georgia within the Kingdom of Georgia. In early Muslim sources, the term "Abkhazia" was generally used in the meaning of Georgia. The Russian  is adapted from the Georgian . Abkhazia's name in most languages are derived directly from the Russian.

The state is formally designated as the "Republic of Abkhazia" or "Apsny".

A common spelling in the English language before the 20th century was Abhasia.

History

Early history

Between the 9th and 6th centuries BC, the territory of modern Abkhazia was part of the ancient Georgian kingdom of Colchis. Around the 6th century BC, the Greeks established trade colonies along the Black Sea coast of present-day Abkhazia, in particular at Pitiunt and Dioscurias.

Classical authors described various peoples living in the region and the great multitude of languages they spoke. Arrian, Pliny and Strabo have given accounts of the Abasgoi and Moschoi peoples somewhere in modern Abkhazia on the eastern shore of the Black Sea. This region was subsequently absorbed in 63 BC into the Kingdom of Lazica.

Within the Roman / Byzantine Empire 
The Roman Empire conquered Lazica in the 1st century AD; however, the Romans exercised little control over the hinterland of Abkhazia. According to Arrian, the Abasgoi and Apsilae peoples were nominal Roman subjects, and there was a small Roman outpost in Dioscurias. After the 4th century Lazica regained a measure of independence, but remained within the Byzantine Empire's sphere of influence. Anacopia was the principality's capital. The country was mostly Christian, with the archbishop's seat in Pityus. Although the exact time when the population of the region of Abkhazia was converted to Christianity has not been determined, it is known that Stratophilus, the Metropolitan of Pityus, participated in the First Council of Nicaea in 325. According to an Eastern tradition Simon the Zealot died in Abkhazia having come there on a missionary trip and was buried in Nicopsis.

Around the middle of the 6th century AD, the Byzantines and the neighbouring Sassanid Persia fought for supremacy over Abkhazia for 20 years, a conflict known as the Lazic War. In 550, during the Lazic War, the Abasgians (Abasgoi) revolted against the Eastern Roman (Byzantine) Empire and called upon Sasanian assistance. General Bessas, however, suppressed the Abasgian revolt.

An Arab incursion into Abasgia, led by Marwan II, was repelled by Prince Leon I jointly with his Lazic and Iberian allies in 736. Leon I then married Mirian's daughter and a successor, Leon II exploited this dynastic union to acquire Lazica in the 770s. Presumably considered as a successor state of Lazica (Egrisi in Georgian sources), this new polity continued to be referred to as Egrisi in some contemporary Georgian and Armenian chronicles (e.g. The Vitae of the Georgian Kings by Leonti Mroveli and The History of Armenia by Hovannes Draskhanakertsi).

Within the Georgian sphere 

The successful defence against the Arab Caliphate, and new territorial gains in the east, gave the Abasgian princes enough power to claim more autonomy from the Byzantine Empire. Towards circa 778, Prince Leon II, with the help of the Khazars declared independence from the Byzantine Empire and transferred his residence to Kutaisi. During this period the Georgian language replaced Greek as the language of literacy and culture.

The western Georgian kingdom of Abkhazia flourished between 850 and 950, which ended by unification of Abkhazia and eastern Georgian states under a single Georgian monarchy ruled by King Bagrat III at the end of the 10th century and the beginning of the 11th century.

In the 12th century, king David the Builder appointed Otagho as an Eristavi of Abkhazia, who later became the founder of House of Shervashidze (also known as Chachba).

In the 1240s, Mongols divided Georgia into eight military-administrative sectors (dumans). The territory of contemporary Abkhazia formed part of the duman administered by Tsotne Dadiani.

Ottoman domination 
In the 16th century, after the break-up of the Georgian Kingdom into small kingdoms and principalities, Principality of Abkhazia (nominally a vassal of the Kingdom of Imereti) emerged, ruled by the Shervashidze dynasty. Since the 1570s, when the Ottoman navy occupied the fort of Tskhumi, Abkhazia came under the influence of the Ottoman Empire and Islam. Under Ottoman rule, the majority of the Abkhaz elite converted to Islam. The principality retained a degree of autonomy.

Abkhazia sought protection from the Russian Empire in 1801, but was declared "an autonomous principality" by the Russians in 1810. Russia then annexed Abkhazia in 1864, and Abkhaz resistance was quashed as the Russians deported Muslim Abkhaz to Ottoman territories.

Within the Russian Empire

In the beginning of the 19th century, while the Russians and Ottomans were vying for control of the region, the rulers of Abkhazia shifted back and forth across the religious divide. The first attempt to enter into relations with Russia was made by Kelesh-Bey in 1803, shortly after the incorporation of eastern Georgia into the expanding Tsarist empire (1801). However, the pro-Ottoman orientation prevailed for a short time after his assassination by his son Aslan-Bey on 2 May 1808. On 2 July 1810, the Russian Marines stormed Sukhum-Kale and had Aslan-Bey replaced with his rival brother, Sefer-Bey (1810–1821), who had converted to Christianity and assumed the name of George. Abkhazia joined the Russian Empire as an autonomous principality, in 1810. However, George's rule was limited and many mountain regions were as independent as before. The next Russo-Turkish war strongly enhanced the Russian positions, leading to a further split in the Abkhaz elite, mainly along religious divisions. During the Crimean War (1853–1856), Russian forces had to evacuate Abkhazia and Prince Michael (1822–1864) seemingly switched to the Ottomans.

Later on, the Russian presence strengthened and the highlanders of Western Caucasia were finally subjugated by Russia in 1864. The autonomy of Abkhazia, which had functioned as a pro-Russian "buffer zone" in this troublesome region, was no longer needed by the Tsarist government and the rule of the Shervashidze came to an end; in November 1864, Prince Michael was forced to renounce his rights and resettle in Voronezh. Later that same year, Abkhazia was incorporated into the Russian Empire as a special military province of Sukhum-Kale which was transformed, in 1883, into an okrug as part of the Kutais Governorate. Large numbers of Muslim Abkhazians, said to have constituted as much as 40% of the Abkhazian population, emigrated to the Ottoman Empire between 1864 and 1878, together with other Muslim populations of the Caucasus, a process known as Muhajirism.

Large areas of the region were left uninhabited and many Armenians, Georgians, Russians and others subsequently migrated to Abkhazia, resettling much of the vacated territory. Some Georgian historians assert that Georgian tribes (Svans and Mingrelians) had populated Abkhazia since the time of the Colchis kingdom.

By official decision of the Russian authorities the residents of Abkhazia and Samurzakano had to study and pray in Russian. After the mass deportation of 1878, Abkhazians were left in the minority, officially branded "guilty people", and had no leader capable of mounting serious opposition to Russification.

British mountaineer Douglas Freshfield (who led an expedition to the Caucasus and was the first to climb Kazbek) described the denuded territories of Abkhazia in a moving chapter 'The Solitude of Abkhazia' in The Exploration of the Caucasus published in 1892.

On 17 March 1898 the synodal department of the Russian Orthodox Church of Georgia-Imereti, by order 2771, again prohibited teaching and the conduct of religious services in church schools and churches of the Sukhumi district in Georgian. Mass protests by the Georgian population of Abkhazia and Samurzakano followed, news of which reached the Russian emperor. On 3 September 1898 the Holy Synod issued order 4880 which decreed that those parishes where the congregation was Mingrelians i.e. Georgians, conduct both church services and church education in Georgian, while Abkhazian parishes use old Slavic. In the Sukhumi district, this order was carried out in only three of 42 parishes. Tedo Sakhokia demanded the Russian authorities introduce Abkhazian and Georgian languages in church services and education. The official response was a criminal case brought against Tedo Sakhokia and leaders of his "Georgian Party" active in Abkhazia.

Within the Soviet Union

The Russian Revolution of 1917 led to the creation of an independent Georgia in 1918. Abkhazia remained part of Georgia after a peasant revolt supported by Bolsheviks and a Turkish expedition were defeated in 1918 and the 1921 Georgian constitution granted Abkhazia autonomy.

In 1921, the Bolshevik Red Army invaded Georgia and ended its short-lived independence. Abkhazia was made a Socialist Soviet Republic (SSR Abkhazia) with the ambiguous status of a treaty republic associated with the Georgian SSR. In 1931, Joseph Stalin made it an autonomous republic (Abkhaz Autonomous Soviet Socialist Republic or in short Abkhaz ASSR) within the Georgian SSR. Despite its nominal autonomy, it was subjected to strong direct rule from central Soviet authorities. Under the rule of Stalin and Beria Abkhaz schools were closed, requiring Abkhaz children to study in the Georgian language. The publishing of materials in Abkhazian dwindled and was eventually stopped altogether; Abkhazian schools were closed in 1945/46. In the terror of 1937–38, the ruling elite was purged of Abkhaz and by 1952 over 80% of the 228 top party and government officials and enterprise managers were ethnic Georgians; there remained 34 Abkhaz, 7 Russians and 3 Armenians in these positions. Georgian Communist Party leader Candide Charkviani supported the Georgianization of Abkhazia. Peasant households from the rest of the Georgian SSR were resettled to Abkhazia.

The policy of repression was eased after Stalin's death and Beria's execution, and the Abkhaz were given a greater role in the governance of the republic. As in most of the smaller autonomous republics, the Soviet government encouraged the development of culture and particularly of literature. The Abkhazian ASSR was the only autonomous republic in the USSR in which the language of the titular nation (in that case Abkhazian) was confirmed in its constitution as one of its official languages.

Post-Soviet Georgia

As the Soviet Union began to disintegrate at the end of the 1980s, ethnic tensions grew between the Abkhaz and Georgians over Georgia's moves towards independence. Many Abkhaz opposed this, fearing that an independent Georgia would lead to the elimination of their autonomy, and argued instead for the establishment of Abkhazia as a separate Soviet republic in its own right. With the onset of perestroika, the agenda of Abkhaz nationalists became more radical and exclusive. In 1988 they began to ask for the reinstatement of Abkhazia's former status of Union republic, as the submission of Abkhazia to another Union republic was not considered to give enough guarantees of their development. They justified their request by referring to the Leninist tradition of the right of nations to self-determination, which, they asserted, was violated when Abkhazia's sovereignty was curtailed in 1931. In June 1988, a manifesto defending Abkhaz distinctiveness (known as the Abkhaz Letter) was sent to Soviet leader Mikhail Gorbachev.

The Georgian–Abkhaz dispute turned violent on 16 July 1989 in Sukhumi. Numerous Georgians were killed or injured when they tried to enroll in a Georgian university instead of an Abkhaz one. After several days of violence, Soviet troops restored order in the city.

In March 1990, Georgia declared sovereignty, unilaterally nullifying treaties concluded by the Soviet government since 1921 and thereby moving closer to independence. The Republic of Georgia boycotted the 17 March 1991 all-Union referendum on the renewal of the Soviet Union called by Gorbachev; however, 52.3% of Abkhazia's population (almost all of the ethnic non-Georgian population) took part in the referendum and voted by an overwhelming majority (98.6%) to preserve the Union. Most ethnic non-Georgians in Abkhazia later boycotted a 31 March referendum on Georgia's independence, which was supported by a huge majority of Georgia's population. Within weeks, Georgia declared independence on 9 April 1991, under former Soviet dissident Zviad Gamsakhurdia. Under Gamsakhurdia, the situation was relatively calm in Abkhazia and a power-sharing agreement was soon reached between the Abkhaz and Georgian factions, granting to the Abkhaz a certain over-representation in the local legislature.

Gamsakhurdia's rule was soon challenged by armed opposition groups, under the command of Tengiz Kitovani, that forced him to flee the country in a military coup in January 1992. Former Soviet foreign minister and architect of the disintegration of the USSR Eduard Shevardnadze became the country's head of state, inheriting a government dominated by hard-line Georgian nationalists.

On 21 February 1992, Georgia's ruling military council announced that it was abolishing the Soviet-era constitution and restoring the 1921 Constitution of the Democratic Republic of Georgia. Many Abkhaz interpreted this as an abolition of their autonomous status, although the 1921 constitution contained a provision for the region's autonomy. On 23 July 1992, the Abkhaz faction in the republic's Supreme Council declared effective independence from Georgia, although the session was boycotted by ethnic Georgian deputies and the gesture went unrecognised by any other country. The Abkhaz leadership launched a campaign of ousting Georgian officials from their offices, a process which was accompanied by violence. In the meantime, the Abkhaz leader Vladislav Ardzinba intensified his ties with hard-line Russian politicians and military elite and declared he was ready for a war with Georgia.

War in Abkhazia 

In August 1992, the Georgian government accused Gamsakhurdia's supporters of kidnapping Georgia's Interior Minister and holding him captive in Abkhazia. The Georgian government dispatched 3,000 soldiers to the region, ostensibly to restore order. The Abkhaz were relatively unarmed at the time and the Georgian troops were able to march into Sukhumi with relatively little resistance and subsequently engaged in ethnically based pillage, looting, assault, and murder. The Abkhaz units were forced to retreat to Gudauta and Tkvarcheli.

The Abkhaz military defeat was met with a hostile response by the self-styled Confederation of Mountain Peoples of the Caucasus, an umbrella group uniting a number of movements in the North Caucasus, including elements of Circassians, Abazins, Chechens, Cossacks, Ossetians and hundreds of volunteer paramilitaries and mercenaries from Russia, including the then-little-known Shamil Basayev, later a leader of the anti-Moscow Chechen secessionists. They sided with the Abkhaz separatists to fight against the Georgian government. In the case of Basayev, it has been suggested that when he and the members of his battalion came to Abkhazia, they received training by the Russian Army (though others dispute this), presenting another possible motive. In September, the Abkhaz and North Caucasian paramilitaries mounted a major offensive against Gagra after breaking a cease-fire, which drove the Georgian forces out of large swathes of the republic. Shevardnadze's government accused Russia of giving covert military support to the rebels with the aim of "detaching from Georgia its native territory and the Georgia-Russian frontier land". 1992 ended with the rebels in control of much of Abkhazia northwest of Sukhumi.

The conflict was in stalemate until July 1993, when Abkhaz separatist militias launched an abortive attack on Georgian-held Sukhumi. They surrounded and heavily shelled the capital, where Shevardnadze was trapped. The warring sides agreed to a Russian-brokered truce in Sochi at the end of July. But the ceasefire broke down again on 16 September 1993. Abkhaz forces, with armed support from outside Abkhazia, launched attacks on Sukhumi and Ochamchira. Notwithstanding UN Security Council's call for the immediate cessation of hostilities and its condemnation of the violation of the ceasefire by the Abkhaz side, fighting continued. After ten days of heavy fighting, Sukhumi was taken by Abkhazian forces on 27 September 1993. Shevardnadze narrowly escaped death, after vowing to stay in the city no matter what. He changed his mind, however, and decided to flee when separatist snipers fired on the hotel where he was staying. Abkhaz, North Caucasian militants, and their allies committed numerous atrocities against the city's remaining ethnic Georgians, in what has been dubbed the Sukhumi Massacre. The mass killings and destruction continued for two weeks, leaving thousands dead and missing.

The Abkhaz forces quickly overran the rest of Abkhazia as the Georgian government faced a second threat; an uprising by the supporters of the deposed Zviad Gamsakhurdia in the region of Mingrelia (Samegrelo). Only a small region of eastern Abkhazia, the upper Kodori gorge, remained under Georgian control (until 2008).

During the war, gross human rights violations were reported on both sides (see Human Rights Watch report). Georgian troops have been accused of having committed looting and murders "for the purpose of terrorising, robbing and driving the Abkhaz population out of their homes" in the first phase of the war (according to Human Rights Watch), while Georgia blames the Abkhaz forces and their allies for the ethnic cleansing of Georgians in Abkhazia, which has also been recognised by the Organization for Security and Cooperation in Europe (OSCE) Summits in Budapest (1994), Lisbon (1996) and Istanbul (1999).

Ethnic cleansing of Georgians

Before the 1992 War, Georgians made up nearly half of Abkhazia's population, while less than one-fifth of the population was Abkhaz. As the war progressed, confronted with hundreds of thousands of ethnic Georgians who were unwilling to leave their homes, the Abkhaz separatists implemented the process of ethnic cleansing in order to expel and eliminate the Georgian ethnic population in Abkhazia. About 5,000 were killed, 400 went missing and up to 250,000 ethnic Georgians were expelled from their homes. According to International Crisis Group, as of 2006 slightly over 200,000 Georgians remained displaced in Georgia proper.

The campaign of ethnic cleansing also included Russians, Armenians, Greeks, moderate Abkhaz and other minor ethnic groups living in Abkhazia. More than 20,000 houses owned by ethnic Georgians were destroyed. Hundreds of schools, kindergartens, churches, hospitals, and historical monuments were pillaged and destroyed. Following the process of ethnic cleansing and mass expulsion, the population of Abkhazia has been reduced to 216,000, from 525,000 in 1989.

Of about 250,000 Georgian refugees, some 60,000 subsequently returned to Abkhazia's Gali District between 1994 and 1998, but tens of thousands were displaced again when fighting resumed in the Gali District in 1998. Nevertheless, between 40,000 and 60,000 refugees have returned to the Gali District since 1998, including persons commuting daily across the ceasefire line and those migrating seasonally in accordance with agricultural cycles. The human rights situation remained precarious for a while in the Georgian-populated areas of the Gali District. The United Nations and other international organisations have been fruitlessly urging the Abkhaz de facto authorities "to refrain from adopting measures incompatible with the right to return and with international human rights standards, such as discriminatory legislation... [and] to cooperate in the establishment of a permanent international human rights office in Gali and to admit United Nations civilian police without further delay." Key officials of the Gali District are virtually all ethnic Abkhaz, though their support staff are ethnic Georgian.

Post-war

Presidential elections were held in Abkhazia on 3 October 2004. Russia supported Raul Khadjimba, the prime minister backed by the ailing outgoing separatist President Vladislav Ardzinba. Posters of Russia's President Vladimir Putin together with Khadjimba, who, like Putin, had worked as a KGB official, were everywhere in Sukhumi. Deputies of Russia's parliament and Russian singers, led by Joseph Cobsohn, a State Duma deputy and a popular singer, came to Abkhazia, campaigning for Khadjimba.

However, Raul Khadjimba lost the elections to Sergei Bagapsh. The tense situation in the republic led to the cancellation of the election results by the Supreme Court. After that, a deal was struck between former rivals to run jointly, with Bagapsh as a presidential candidate and Khadjimba as a vice-presidential candidate. They received more than 90% of the votes in the new election.

In July 2006, Georgian forces launched a successful police operation against the rebelled administrator of the Georgian-populated Kodori Gorge, Emzar Kvitsiani. Kvitsiani had been appointed by the previous president of Georgia Edvard Shevardnadze and refused to recognise the authority of president Mikheil Saakashvili, who succeeded Shevardnadze after the Rose Revolution. Although Kvitsiani escaped capture by Georgian police, the Kodori Gorge was brought back under the control of the central government in Tbilisi.

Sporadic acts of violence continued throughout the postwar years. Despite the peacekeeping status of the Russian peacekeepers in Abkhazia, Georgian officials routinely claimed that Russian peacekeepers were inciting violence by supplying Abkhaz rebels with arms and financial support. Russian support of Abkhazia became pronounced when the Russian ruble became the de facto currency and Russia began issuing passports to the population of Abkhazia. Georgia has also accused Russia of violating its airspace by sending helicopters to attack Georgian-controlled towns in the Kodori Gorge. In April 2008, a Russian MiG – prohibited from Georgian airspace, including Abkhazia – shot down a Georgian UAV.

On 9 August 2008, Abkhazian forces fired on Georgian forces in Kodori Gorge. This coincided with the 2008 South Ossetia war where Russia decided to support the Ossetian separatists who had been attacked by Georgia. The conflict escalated into a full-scale war between the Russian Federation and the Republic of Georgia. On 10 August 2008, an estimated 9,000 Russian soldiers entered Abkhazia ostensibly to reinforce the Russian peacekeepers in the republic. About 1,000 Abkhazian soldiers moved to expel the residual Georgian forces within Abkhazia in the Upper Kodori Gorge. By 12 August the Georgian forces and civilians had evacuated the last part of Abkhazia under Georgian government control. Russia recognised the independence of Abkhazia on 26 August 2008. This was followed by the annulment of the 1994 ceasefire agreement and the termination of UN and OSCE monitoring missions. On 28 August 2008, the Parliament of Georgia passed a resolution declaring Abkhazia a Russian-occupied territory.

Since independence was recognised by Russia, a series of controversial agreements were made between the Abkhazian government and the Russian Federation that leased or sold a number of key state assets and relinquished control over the borders. In May 2009 several opposition parties and war veteran groups protested against these deals complaining that they undermined state sovereignty and risked exchanging one colonial power (Georgia) for another (Russia). The vice-president, Raul Khadjimba, resigned on 28 May saying he agreed with the criticism the opposition had made. Subsequently, a conference of opposition parties nominated Raul Khadjimba as their candidate in the December 2009 Abkhazian presidential election won by Sergei Bagapsh.

Political developments since 2014 

In the spring of 2014, the opposition submitted an ultimatum to President Aleksandr Ankvab to dismiss the government and make radical reforms. On 27 May 2014, in the centre of Sukhumi, 10,000 supporters of the Abkhaz opposition gathered for a mass demonstration. On the same day, Ankvab's headquarters in Sukhumi was stormed by opposition groups led by Raul Khadjimba, forcing him into flight to Gudauta. The opposition claimed that the protests were sparked by poverty, but the main point of contention was President Ankvab's liberal policy towards ethnic Georgians in the Gali region. The opposition said these policies could endanger Abkhazia's ethnic Abkhazian identity.

After Ankvab fled the capital, on 31 May, the People's Assembly of Abkhazia appointed parliamentary speaker Valery Bganba as acting president, declaring Ankvab unable to serve. It also decided to hold an early presidential election on 24 August 2014. Ankvab soon declared his formal resignation, although he accused his opponents of acting immorally and violating the constitution. Khajimba was later elected president, taking office in September 2014.

In November 2014, Vladimir Putin moved to formalise the Abkhazian military's relationship as part of the Russian armed forces, signing a treaty with Khajimba. The Georgian government denounced the agreement as "a step towards annexation".

In December 2021, there was unrest in the territory.

Status

Abkhazia, Artsakh (also known as the Nagorno Karabakh Republic), Transnistria, and South Ossetia are post-Soviet "frozen conflict" zones. These four states maintain friendly relations with each other and form the Community for Democracy and Rights of Nations. Russia and Nicaragua officially recognised Abkhazia after the Russo-Georgian War. Venezuela recognised Abkhazia in September 2009. In December 2009, Nauru recognised Abkhazia, reportedly in return for $50 million in humanitarian aid from Russia. The unrecognised republic of Transnistria and the partially recognised republic of South Ossetia have recognised Abkhazia since 2006. Abkhazia is also a member of the Unrepresented Nations and Peoples Organization (UNPO).

A majority of sovereign states recognise Abkhazia as an integral part of Georgia and support its territorial integrity according to the principles of international law, although Belarus has expressed sympathy toward the recognition of Abkhazia. Some have officially noted Abkhazia as under occupation by the Russian military. The United Nations has been urging both sides to settle the dispute through diplomatic dialogue and ratifying the final status of Abkhazia in the Georgian constitution. However, the Abkhaz de facto government considers Abkhazia a sovereign country even if it is recognised by few other countries. In early 2000, then-UN Special Representative of the Secretary General Dieter Boden and the Group of Friends of Georgia, consisting of the representatives of Russia, the United States, Britain, France, and Germany, drafted and informally presented a document to the parties outlining a possible distribution of competencies between the Abkhaz and Georgian authorities, based on core respect for Georgian territorial integrity. The Abkhaz side, however, has never accepted the paper as a basis for negotiations. Eventually, Russia also withdrew its approval of the document. In 2005 and 2008, the Georgian government offered Abkhazia a high degree of autonomy and possible federal structure within the borders and jurisdiction of Georgia.

On 18 October 2006, the People's Assembly of Abkhazia passed a resolution, calling upon Russia, international organisations and the rest of the international community to recognise Abkhaz independence on the basis that Abkhazia possesses all the properties of an independent state. The United Nations has reaffirmed "the commitment of all Member States to the sovereignty, independence and territorial integrity of Georgia within its internationally recognised borders" and outlined the basic principles of conflict resolution which call for immediate return of all displaced persons and for non-resumption of hostilities.

Georgia accuses the Abkhaz secessionists of having conducted a deliberate campaign of ethnic cleansing of up to 250,000 Georgians, a claim supported by the Organization for Security and Co-operation in Europe (OSCE; Budapest, Lisbon and Istanbul declaration). The UN Security Council has avoided the use of the term "ethnic cleansing" but has affirmed "the unacceptability of the demographic changes resulting from the conflict". On 15 May 2008, the United Nations General Assembly adopted a non-binding resolution recognising the right of all refugees (including victims of reported "ethnic cleansing") to return to Abkhazia and to retain or regain their property rights there. It "regretted" the attempts to alter pre-war demographic composition and called for the "rapid development of a timetable to ensure the prompt voluntary return of all refugees and internally displaced persons to their homes."

On 28 March 2008, the President of Georgia Mikheil Saakashvili unveiled his government's new proposals to Abkhazia: the broadest possible autonomy within the framework of a Georgian state, a joint free economic zone, representation in the central authorities including the post of vice-president with the right to veto Abkhaz-related decisions. The Abkhaz leader Sergei Bagapsh rejected these new initiatives as "propaganda", leading to Georgia's complaints that this scepticism was "triggered by Russia, rather than by real mood of the Abkhaz people."

On 3 July 2008, the OSCE Parliamentary Assembly passed a resolution at its annual session in Astana, expressing concern over Russia's recent moves in breakaway Abkhazia. The resolution calls on the Russian authorities to refrain from maintaining ties with the breakaway regions "in any manner that would constitute a challenge to the sovereignty of Georgia" and also urges Russia "to abide by OSCE standards and generally accepted international norms with respect to the threat or use of force to resolve conflicts in relations with other participating States."

On 9 July 2012, the OSCE Parliamentary Assembly passed a resolution at its annual session in Monaco, underlining Georgia's territorial integrity and referring to breakaway Abkhazia and South Ossetia as "occupied territories". The resolution "urges the Government and the Parliament of the Russian Federation, as well as the de facto authorities of Abkhazia, Georgia and South Ossetia, Georgia, to allow the European Union Monitoring Mission unimpeded access to the occupied territories." It also says that the OSCE Parliamentary Assembly is "concerned about the humanitarian situation of the displaced persons both in Georgia and in the occupied territories of Abkhazia, Georgia and South Ossetia, Georgia, as well as the denial of the right of return to their places of living." The Assembly is the parliamentary dimension of the OSCE with 320 lawmakers from the organisation's 57 participating states, including Russia.

Law on occupied territories of Georgia

In late October 2008 President Saakashvili signed into law legislation on the occupied territories passed by the Georgian Parliament. The law covers the breakaway regions of Abkhazia and Tskhinvali (territories of former South Ossetian Autonomous Oblast). The law spells out restrictions on free movement and economic activity in the territories. In particular, according to the law, foreign citizens should enter the two breakaway regions only through Georgia proper. Entry into Abkhazia should be carried out from the Zugdidi District and into South Ossetia from the Gori District. The major road leading to South Ossetia from the rest of Georgia passes through the Gori District.

The legislation, however, also lists "special" cases in which entry into the breakaway regions will not be regarded as illegal. It stipulates that a special permit on entry into the breakaway regions can be issued if the trip there "serves Georgia’s state interests; peaceful resolution of the conflict; de-occupation or humanitarian purposes." The law also bans any type of economic activity – entrepreneurial or non-entrepreneurial, if such activities require permits, licences or registration in accordance with Georgian legislation. It also bans air, sea and railway communications and international transit via the regions, mineral exploration and money transfers. The provision covering economic activities is retroactive, going back to 1990.

The law says that the Russian Federation – the state which has carried out military occupation – is fully responsible for the violation of human rights in Abkhazia and South Ossetia. The Russian Federation, according to the document, is also responsible for compensation of material and moral damage inflicted on Georgian citizens, stateless persons and foreign citizens, who are in Georgia and enter the occupied territories with appropriate permits. The law also says that de facto state agencies and officials operating in the occupied territories are regarded by Georgia as illegal. The law will remain in force until "the full restoration of Georgian jurisdiction" over the breakaway regions is realised.

Status-neutral passports

Currently Georgia considers all residents of Abkhazia its citizens, while they see themselves as Abkhaz citizens.

In the summer of 2011 the Parliament of Georgia adopted a package of legislative amendments providing for the issuance of neutral identification and travel documents to residents of Abkhazia and the former South Ossetian autonomous province of Georgia. The document allows travelling abroad as well as enjoying social benefits existing in Georgia. The new neutral identification and travel documents were called "neutral passports". The status-neutral passports do not carry state symbols of Georgia. Abkhazia's foreign minister, Viacheslav Chirikba, criticised the status-neutral passports and called their introduction "unacceptable". Some Abkhazian residents with Russian passports were being denied Schengen visas.

As of May 2013, neutral documents have been recognised by Japan, the Czech Republic, Latvia, Lithuania, Slovakia, the United States, Bulgaria, Poland, Israel, Estonia and Romania.

According to Russian media, the President of Republic of Abkhazia, Alexander Ankvab threatened international organisations that accepted neutral passports, saying during a meeting with the leadership of the foreign ministry that "international organizations that suggest the so-called neutral passports, will leave Abkhazia."

Russian involvement

During the Georgian–Abkhaz conflict, the Russian authorities and military supplied logistical and military aid to the separatist side. Today, Russia still maintains a strong political and military influence over separatist rule in Abkhazia. Russia has also issued passports to the citizens of Abkhazia since 2000 (as Abkhazian passports cannot be used for international travel) and subsequently paid them retirement pensions and other monetary benefits. More than 80% of the Abkhazian population had received Russian passports by 2006. As Russian citizens living abroad, Abkhazians do not pay Russian taxes or serve in the Russian Army. About 53,000 Abkhazian passports have been issued as of May 2007.

Moscow, at certain times, hinted that it might recognise Abkhazia and South Ossetia when Western countries recognised the independence of Kosovo, suggesting that they had created a precedent. Following Kosovo's declaration of independence, the Russian parliament released a joint statement reading: "Now that the situation in Kosovo has become an international precedent, Russia should take into account the Kosovo scenario... when considering ongoing territorial conflicts." Initially Russia continued to delay recognition of both of these republics. However, on 16 April 2008, the outgoing Russian president Vladimir Putin instructed his government to establish official ties with South Ossetia and Abkhazia, leading to Georgia's condemnation of what it described as an attempt at "de facto annexation" and criticism from the European Union, NATO, and several Western governments.

Later in April 2008, Russia accused Georgia of trying to exploit NATO support in order to control Abkhazia by force and announced it would increase its military presence in the region, pledging to retaliate militarily against Georgia's efforts. The Georgian Prime Minister Lado Gurgenidze said Georgia will treat any additional troops in Abkhazia as "aggressors".

In response to the Russo-Georgian War, the Federal Assembly of Russia called an extraordinary session for 25 August 2008 to discuss recognition of Abkhazia and South Ossetia. Following a unanimous resolution that was passed by both houses of the parliament calling on the Russian president to recognise independence of the breakaway republics, Russian president, Dmitry Medvedev, officially recognised both on 26 August 2008. Russian recognition was condemned by NATO nations, OSCE and European Council nations due to "violation of territorial integrity and international law". UN Secretary-General Ban Ki-moon stated that sovereign states have to decide themselves whether they want to recognise the independence of disputed regions.

Russia has started work on the establishment of a naval base in Ochamchire by dredging the coast to allow the passage of their larger naval vessels. As a response to the Georgian sea blockade of Abkhazia, in which the Georgian coast guard had been detaining ships heading to and from Abkhazia, Russia warned Georgia against ship seizures and said that a unit of Russian guard boats would provide security for ships bound to Abkhazia.

The extent of Russian influence in Abkhazia has caused some locals to say Abkhazia is under full Russian control, but they still prefer Russian influence over Georgian.

International involvement

The UN has played various roles during the conflict and peace process: a military role through its observer mission (UNOMIG); dual diplomatic roles through the Security Council and the appointment of a special envoy, succeeded by a special representative to the secretary-general; a humanitarian role (UNHCR and UNOCHA); a development role (UNDP); a human rights role (UNHCHR); and a low-key capacity and confidence-building role (UNV). The UN's position has been that there will be no forcible change in international borders. Any settlement must be freely negotiated and based on autonomy for Abkhazia legitimised by referendum under international observation once the multi-ethnic population has returned.

The OSCE has increasingly engaged in dialogue with officials and civil society representatives in Abkhazia, especially from non-governmental organisations (NGO)s and the media, regarding human dimension standards in the region and is considering a presence in Gali. The OSCE expressed concern and condemnation over ethnic cleansing of Georgians in Abkhazia during the 1994 Budapest Summit Decision and later at the Lisbon Summit Declaration in 1996.

The US rejects the unilateral secession of Abkhazia and urges its integration into Georgia as an autonomous unit. In 1998 the US announced its readiness to allocate up to $15 million for rehabilitation of infrastructure in the Gali region if substantial progress is made in the peace process. USAID has already funded some humanitarian initiatives for Abkhazia.

On 22 August 2006, Senator Richard Lugar, then visiting Georgia's capital Tbilisi, joined Georgian politicians in criticism of the Russian peacekeeping mission, stating that "the U.S. administration supports the Georgian government’s insistence on the withdrawal of Russian peacekeepers from the conflict zones in Abkhazia and the Tskhinvali district".

On 5 October 2006, Javier Solana, the High Representative for the Common Foreign and Security Policy of the European Union, ruled out the possibility of replacing the Russian peacekeepers with the EU force.  On 10 October 2006, EU South Caucasus envoy Peter Semneby noted that "Russia's actions in the Georgia spy row have damaged its credibility as a neutral peacekeeper in the EU's Black Sea neighbourhood."

On 13 October 2006, the UN Security Council unanimously adopted a resolution, based on a Group of Friends of the Secretary-General draft, extending the UNOMIG mission until 15 April 2007. Acknowledging that the "new and tense situation" resulted, at least in part, from the Georgian special forces' operation in the upper Kodori Valley, the resolution urged the country to ensure that no troops unauthorised by the Moscow ceasefire agreement were present in that area. It urged the leadership of the Abkhaz side to address seriously the need for a dignified, secure return of refugees and internally displaced persons and to reassure the local population in the Gali district that their residency rights and identity will be respected. The Georgian side is "once again urged to address seriously legitimate Abkhaz security concerns, to avoid steps that could be seen as threatening and to refrain from militant rhetoric and provocative actions, especially in upper Kodori Valley."

Calling on both parties to follow up on dialogue initiatives, it further urged them to comply fully with all previous agreements regarding non-violence and confidence-building, in particular those concerning the separation of forces. Regarding the disputed role of the peacekeepers from the Commonwealth of Independent States (CIS), the Council stressed the importance of close, effective cooperation between UNOMIG and that force and looked to all sides to continue to extend the necessary cooperation to them. At the same time, the document reaffirmed the "commitment of all Member States to the sovereignty, independence and territorial integrity of Georgia within its internationally recognised borders".

The HALO Trust, an international non-profit organisation that specialises in the removal of the debris of war, has been active in Abkhazia since 1999 and has completed the removal of landmines in Sukhumi and Gali districts. It declared Abkhazia "mine free" in 2011.

France-based international NGO Première-Urgence has been implementing a food security programme to support the vulnerable populations affected by the frozen conflict for almost 10 years.

Russia does not allow the European Union Monitoring Mission (EUMM) to enter Abkhazia.

Recognition

The following is a list of political entities that formally recognise Abkhazia.

UN member states
  Russia recognised Abkhazia on 26 August 2008 after the Russo-Georgian War.
  Nicaragua recognised Abkhazia on 5 September 2008.
  Venezuela recognised Abkhazia on 10 September 2009.
  Nauru recognised Abkhazia on 15 December 2009.
  Syria recognised Abkhazia on 29 May 2018.

Partially recognised and unrecognised territories
  South Ossetia recognised Abkhazia on 17 November 2006.
  Transnistria recognised Abkhazia on 17 November 2006.
 Artsakh recognised Abkhazia on 17 November 2006.

Former recognition
  Vanuatu recognised Abkhazia on 23 May 2011, but withdrew recognition on 20 May 2013.
  Tuvalu recognised Abkhazia on 18 September 2011, but withdrew recognition on 31 March 2014.

Geography and climate

The Caucasus Mountains to the north and northeast separate Abkhazia and the Russian Federation. To the east and southeast, Abkhazia is bounded by the Georgian region of Samegrelo-Zemo Svaneti; and on the south and southwest by the Black Sea.

Abkhazia is diverse geographically with lowlands stretching to the extremely mountainous north. The Greater Caucasus Mountain Range runs along the region's northern border, with its spursthe Gagra, Bzyb and Kodori rangesdividing the area into a number of deep, well-watered valleys. Abkhazia's landscape ranges from coastal forests and citrus plantations to permanent snows and glaciers in the north of the region. Although Abkhazia's complex topographic setting has spared most of the territory from significant human development, its cultivated fertile lands produce tea, tobacco, wine and fruits, a mainstay of the local agricultural sector.

Abkhazia is richly irrigated by small rivers originating in the Caucasus Mountains. Chief of these are: Kodori, Bzyb, Ghalidzga, and Gumista. The Psou River separates the region from Russia, and the Inguri serves as a boundary between Abkhazia and Georgia proper. There are several periglacial and crater lakes in mountainous Abkhazia. Lake Ritsa is the most important of them.

Because of Abkhazia's proximity to the Black Sea and the shield of the Caucasus Mountains, the region's climate is very mild. The climate at higher elevations varies from maritime mountainous to cold and summerless. Also, due to its position on the windward slopes of the Caucasus, Abkhazia receives high amounts of precipitation, though humidity decreases further inland. The mountains of Abkhazia receive significant amounts of snow.

The world's deepest known cave, Veryovkina Cave, is located in Abkhazia's western Caucasus mountains.

The lowland regions used to be covered by swaths of oak, beech, and hornbeam, which have since been cleared.

There are two main entrances into Abkhazia. The southern entrance is at the Inguri bridge, a short distance from the city of Zugdidi. The northern entrance ("Psou") is in the town of Leselidze. Owing to the situation with a recognition controversy, many foreign governments advise their citizens against travelling to Abkhazia. According to President Raul Khajimba, over the summer of 2015, thousands of tourists visited Abkhazia.

Politics and government

Republic of Abkhazia

Abkhazia is a presidential republic, and the second elected president of Abkhazia was Sergei Bagapsh. Bagapsh came to power following the deeply divisive October 2004 presidential election. The next election was held on 12 December 2009. Bagapsh was re-elected as president with 59.4% of the total vote. Alexander Ankvab, his vice-president, was appointed acting president after the former president's death on 29 May 2011 until winning election in his own right later on 26 August 2011.

Legislative powers are vested in the People's Assembly, which consists of 35 elected members. The last parliamentary elections were held in March 2017. Ethnicities other than Abkhaz (Armenians, Russians and Georgians) are claimed to be under-represented in the Assembly.

Most refugees from the 1992–1993 war (mainly ethnic Georgians) have not been able to return and have thus been excluded from the political process.

Abkhazian officials have stated that they have given the Russian Federation the responsibility of representing their interests abroad.

According to a 2010 study published by the University of Colorado Boulder, the vast majority of Abkhazia's population supports independence, while a smaller number is in favour of joining the Russian Federation. Support for reunification with Georgia is very low. Even among ethnic Georgians, nearly 50% prefer Abkhazia to remain an independent state and less than 20% of them believe returning to Georgia is necessary, as most of them have adjusted to the current situation. Among ethnic Abkhaz, explicit support for reunification with Georgia is around 1%; a similar figure can be found among ethnic Russians and Armenians as well.

Autonomous Republic of Abkhazia

The Government of the Autonomous Republic of Abkhazia is the government in exile that Georgia recognises as the legal government of Abkhazia. This pro-Georgian government maintained a foothold on Abkhazian territory, in the upper Kodori Valley from July 2006 until it was forced out by fighting in August 2008. This government is also partly responsible for the affairs of some 250,000 IDPs, forced to leave Abkhazia following the War in Abkhazia and ethnic cleansing that followed. The current Head of the Government is Vakhtang Kolbaia.

During the War in Abkhazia, the Government of the Autonomous Republic of Abkhazia (at the time the Georgian faction of the "Council of Ministers of Abkhazia") left Abkhazia after the Abkhaz separatist forces took control of the region's capital Sukhumi and relocated to Georgia's capital Tbilisi where it operated as the Government of Abkhazia in exile for almost 13 years. During this period, the Government of Abkhazia in exile, led by Tamaz Nadareishvili, was known for a hard-line stance towards the Abkhaz problem and frequently voiced their opinion that the solution to the conflict can be attained only through Georgia's military response to secessionism. Later, Nadareishvili's administration was implicated in some internal controversies and had not taken an active part in the politics of Abkhazia until a new chairman, Irakli Alasania, was appointed by President of Georgia, Mikheil Saakashvili, his envoy in the peace talks over Abkhazia.

Administrative divisions

The Republic of Abkhazia is divided into seven raions named after their primary cities: Gagra, Gudauta, Sukhumi, Ochamchira, Gulripshi, Tkvarcheli and Gali. These districts remain mostly unchanged since the break-up of the Soviet Union, with the exception of the Tkvarcheli District, created in 1995 from parts of the Ochamchira and Gali districts.

The President of the Republic appoints districts' heads from those elected to the districts' assemblies. There are elected village assemblies whose heads are appointed by the districts' heads.

The administrative subdivisions under Georgian law are identical to the ones outlined above, except for the new Tkvarcheli district.

Military

The Abkhazian Armed Forces are the military of the Republic of Abkhazia. The basis of the Abkhazian armed forces was formed by the ethnically Abkhaz National Guard, which was established in early 1992. Most of their weapons come from the former Russian airborne division base in Gudauta. The Abkhazian military is primarily a ground force, but includes small sea and air units. Russia deploys its own military units as part of the 7th Military Base in Abkhazia. These units are reportedly subordinate to the Russian 49th Army and include both ground elements and air defence assets.

The Abkhazian Armed Forces are composed of:
 The Abkhazian Land Forces with a permanent force of around 5,000, but with reservists and paramilitary personnel this may increase to up to 50,000 in times of military conflict. The exact numbers and the type of equipment used remain unverifiable.
 The Abkhazian Navy that consists of three divisions based in Sukhumi, Ochamchire and Pitsunda, but the Russian coast guard patrols their waters.
 The Abkhazian Air Force, a small unit consisting of a few fighter aircraft and helicopters.

Economy

The economy of Abkhazia is integrated with Russia as outlined in a bilateral agreement published in November 2014. The country uses the Russian ruble as its currency, and the two countries share a common economic and customs union. Abkhazia has experienced a modest economic upswing since the 2008 South Ossetia war and Russia's subsequent recognition of Abkhazia's independence. About half of Abkhazia's state budget is financed with aid money from Russia.

Tourism is a key industry and, according to Abkhazia's authorities, almost a million tourists (mainly from Russia) came to Abkhazia in 2007. Abkhazia exports wine and fruits, especially tangerines and hazelnuts. Electricity is largely supplied by the Inguri hydroelectric power station located on the Inguri River between Abkhazia and Georgia (proper) and operated jointly by both parties.

In the first half of 2012, the principal trading partners of Abkhazia were Russia (64%) and Turkey (18%). The CIS economic sanctions imposed on Abkhazia in 1996 are still formally in force, but Russia announced on 6 March 2008 that it would no longer participate in them, declaring them "outdated, impeding the socio-economic development of the region, and causing unjustified hardship for the people of Abkhazia". Russia also called on other CIS members to undertake similar steps, but met with protests from Tbilisi and lack of support from the other CIS countries.

Despite the controversial status of the territory and its damaged infrastructure, tourism in Abkhazia grew following the Russian recognition of Abkhazian independence in 2008 due to the arrival of Russian tourists. In 2009 the number of Russian tourists in Abkhazia increased by 20% and the total number of Russian tourists reached 1 million. Low prices and an absence of any visa requirements attracts Russian tourists especially those who cannot afford vacations in Turkey, Egypt, Bulgaria, Montenegro and other popular Russian tourist destinations. After the tourist boom many Russian businesses began to invest money in Abkhazian tourist infrastructure. With the main highway of the country being rebuilt in 2014 many damaged hotels in Gagra are either being restored or demolished. In 2014, 1.16 million Russian tourists visited Abkhazia.

Demographics

According to the last census in 2011 Abkhazia has 240,705 inhabitants. The Department of Statistics of Georgia estimated Abkhazia's population to be approximately 179,000 in 2003, and 178,000 in 2005 (the last year when such estimates were published in Georgia). Encyclopædia Britannica estimates the population in 2007 at 180,000 and the International Crisis Group estimates Abkhazia's total population in 2006 to be between 157,000 and 190,000 (or between 180,000 and 220,000 as estimated by UNDP in 1998).

Ethnicity
The ethnic composition of Abkhazia has played a central role in the Georgian-Abkhazian conflict and is equally contested. The demographics of Abkhazia were very strongly affected by the 1992–1993 war with Georgia, which saw the expulsion and flight of over half of the republic's population, measuring 525,061 in the 1989 census. The population of Abkhazia remains ethnically very diverse, even after the 1992–1993 war. At present the population of Abkhazia is mainly made up of ethnic Abkhaz (50.7% according to the 2011 census), Russians, Armenians, Georgians (mostly Mingrelians), and Greeks. Other ethnicities include Ukrainians, Belarusians, Ossetians, Tatars, Turks, and Roma.

Greeks constituted a significant minority in the area in the early 1920s (50,000), and remained a major ethnic component until 1945 when they were deported to Central Asia. Under the Soviet Union, the Russian, Armenian, and Georgian populations grew faster than the Abkhaz population, due to large-scale enforced migration, especially under the rule of Joseph Stalin and Lavrenty Beria. Russians moved into Abkhazia in great numbers.

At the time of the 1989 census, Abkhazia's Georgian population numbered 239,872 forming around 45.7% of the population, and the Armenian population numbered 77,000. Due to ethnic cleansing and displacement due to people fleeing the 1992–1993 war, much of the Georgian population and to a lesser extent the Russian and Armenian populations had greatly diminished. In 2003 Armenians formed the second-largest minority group in Abkhazia (closely matching the Georgians), numbering 44,869. By the time of the 2011 census, Georgians formed the second-largest minority group with a number of 46,455. Despite the official numbers, unofficial estimates believe that the Georgian and Armenian communities are roughly equal in number.

In the wake of the Syrian civil war Abkhazia granted refugee status to a few hundred Syrians with Abkhaz, Abazin and Circassian ancestry. Facing a growing Armenian community, this move has been linked with the wish of the ruling Abkhaz —who have often been in the minority on their territory— to tilt the demographic balance in favour of the titular nation.

Diaspora
Thousands of Abkhaz, known as muhajirun, were exiled to the Ottoman Empire in the mid-19th century after resisting the Russian conquest of the Caucasus. Today, Turkey is home to the world's largest Abkhaz diaspora community. Size estimates vary – diaspora leaders say 1 million people; Abkhaz estimates range from 150,000 to 500,000.

Religion

A majority of inhabitants of Abkhazia are Christian (Eastern Orthodox (see also: Abkhazian Orthodox Church) and Armenian Apostolic) while a significant minority are Sunni Muslim. The Abkhaz Native Religion has undergone a strong revival in recent decades. There is a very small number of adherents of Judaism, Jehovah's Witnesses and new religious movements. The Jehovah's Witnesses organisation has officially been banned since 1995, though the decree is not currently enforced.

According to the constitutions of both Abkhazia and Georgia, the adherents of all religions have equal rights before the law.

According to a survey held in 2003, 60% of respondents identified themselves as Christian, 16% as Muslim, 8% as atheist or irreligious, 8% as adhering to the traditional Abkhazian religion or as Pagan, 2% as follower of other religions and 6% as undecided.

Language 
Article 6 of the Constitution of Abkhazia states:
The official language of the Republic of Abkhazia shall be the Abkhazian language. The Russian language, equally with the Abkhazian language, shall be recognized as a language of State and other institutions. The State shall guarantee the right to freely use the mother language for all the ethnic groups residing in Abkhazia.

The languages spoken in Abkhazia are Abkhaz, Russian, Mingrelian, Svan, Armenian, and Greek. The Autonomous Republic passed a law in 2007 defining the Abkhaz language as the only state language of Abkhazia. As such, Abkhaz is the required language for legislative and executive council debates (with translation from and to Russian) and at least half of the text of all magazines and newspapers must be in Abkhaz.

Despite the official status of Abkhaz, the dominance of other languages within Abkhazia, especially Russian, is so great that experts as recently as 2004 called it an "endangered language". During the Soviet era, language instruction would begin in schools in Abkhaz, only to switch to Russian for the majority of required schooling. The government of the Republic is attempting to institute Abkhaz-only primary education but there has been limited success due to a lack of facilities and educational materials. Even in Georgian-speaking areas of the Republic, ending schooling in that language has resulted in teachers switching to Russian-language materials instead of Abkhaz-language teaching.

Nationality issues

Adoption of Russian nationality

After the break-up of the Soviet Union, many Abkhazians kept their Soviet passports, even after a decade, and used them to eventually apply for Russian citizenship.

Before 2002, Russian law allowed residents of former Soviet Union to apply for citizenship if they had not become citizens of their newly independent states. The procedure was extremely complex. The new citizenship law of Russia adopted on 31 May 2002 introduced a simplified procedure of citizenship acquisition for former citizens of the Soviet Union regardless of their place of residence. In Abkhazia and South Ossetia, the application process was simplified even further, and people could apply even without leaving their homes. Russian non-governmental organisations with close ties to Russian officialdom simply took their papers to a nearby Russian city for processing.

Abkhazians began mass acquisition of Russian passports in 2002. It is reported that the public organisation the Congress of Russian Communities of Abkhazia started collecting Abkhazians' Soviet-era travel documents. It then sent them to a consular department specially set up by Russian Foreign Ministry officials in the city of Sochi. After they were checked, Abkhazian applicants were granted Russian citizenship. By 25 June 2002, an estimated 150,000 people in Abkhazia had acquired the new passports, joining 50,000 who already possessed Russian citizenship. The Sukhum authorities, although officially not involved in the registration for Russian nationality process, openly encouraged it. Government officials said privately that President Putin's administration agreed with the passport acquisition during Abkhazia's prime minister Djergenia's visit to Moscow in May 2002.

The "passportisation" caused outrage in Tbilisi, worsening its already shaky relations with Russia. The Georgian Foreign Ministry issued a statement insisting that Abkhazians were citizens of Georgia and calling the passport allocation an
"unprecedented illegal campaign". President Eduard Shevardnadze said that he would be asking his Russian counterpart, Vladimir Putin, for an explanation. The speaker of parliament Nino Burjanadze said that she would raise the matter at the forthcoming OSCE parliamentary assembly.

1 February 2011 was the last day in the post-Soviet era when a passport of USSR was valid for crossing the Russian-Abkhaz border. According to the staff of Abkhazia's passport and visa service, there were about two to three thousand mostly elderly people left with Soviet passports who had no chance of acquiring new documents. These people were not able to get Russian citizenship. But they can first get an internal Abkhaz passport and then a travelling passport to visit Russia.

Issue of ethnic Georgians
In 2005, citing the need to integrate ethnic Georgian residents of eastern districts of Abkhazia, the then leadership of Abkhazia showed signs of a softening stance towards granting of citizenship to the residents of Gali, Ochamchire and Tkvarcheli districts.

According to the Abkhazian law on citizenship, ethnic Abkhazians, regardless of place of residence, can become Abkhaz citizens. Those who are not ethnic Abkhazians are eligible for citizenship if they lived in Abkhazia for at least five years prior to adoption of act of independence in October 1999. This provision aimed at creating a legal hurdle in obtaining Abkhaz passports for those ethnic Georgians who fled Abkhazia as a result of 1992–1993 armed conflict and who then returned to the Gali district. Abkhazian legislation forbids citizens of Abkhazia from holding dual citizenship with any other state apart from Russia.

Ethnic Georgians who have returned to the Gali district and want to obtain Abkhaz passports, according to Abkhazian law, should undergo lengthy procedures which also include a requirement to submit documented proof that they renounced their Georgian citizenship. President Bagapsh was inclined to regard Georgians in Gali as "Georgianised Abkhazians." According to Bagapsh, these were actually ethnic Abkhaz people who were "Georgianised" during the long process of the Georgianisation of Abkhazia that culminated during the rule of Joseph Stalin and Lavrenti Beria. So in his official speeches, Bagapsh often added the Gali Georgians to population estimates of the Abkhaz, disregarding the fact that they still thought of themselves as ethnic Georgians rather than Abkhaz.

In early 2013 the process of passportisation of ethnic Georgians came under the scrutiny of Abkhaz opposition groups who turned this issue into one of the central topics of the breakaway region's internal politics, and issuing of passports was suspended in May. Opposition claimed that "massive" passportisation involving granting citizenship to ethnic Georgians in eastern districts was fraught with risk of "losing sovereignty and territorial integrity." According to Apsnypress, Stanislav Lakoba, secretary of Abkhaz security council, said that "We are facing the process of the total Georgianization of Abkhazia."

Pressures have been placed upon teachers in areas of Abkhazia which retain large Georgian populations to abandon the use of the Georgian language in education and adopt Russian textbooks.

On 18 September 2013, the Parliament of Republic of Abkhazia adopted a resolution instructing the prosecutor's office to carry out a "sweeping" probe into passport offices of the interior ministry and where wrongdoings were found in the distribution of passports to refer those violations to the Ministry of Internal Affairs for "annulment of illegally issued passports." Abkhaz officials announced that a significant number of residents of Gali, Ochamchire and Tkvarcheli districts received Abkhaz passports while at the same time retaining their Georgian citizenship, which constituted a "violation of the law on Abkhaz citizenship". According to the Abkhaz officials, more than 26,000 passports were distributed in Gali, Tkvarcheli and Ochamchire districts, including about 23,000 of which were given out since Russian recognition of Abkhazia's independence in August 2008. These political debates have caused concerns in the ethnic Georgian population of Abkhazia, who reside mainly in Gali district, that they would be stripped of Abkhazian citizenship and thus forced to leave Abkhazia again.

In October 2013 Alexander Ankvab signed a document ordering the firing of Stanislav Lakoba. The document did not state any reason for the decision but Lakoba saw it as related to his political position on granting citizenship to Georgians living in Gali. Lakoba claimed that, according to data from the Abkhaz Security Council, 129 local people in Gali fought against Abkhazia. Local political parties and the coordination council of civil organisations expressed concern about Lakoba's dismissal. They claimed that, by dismissing him, the president "made an illegal process legal" – giving Abkhazian passports to Georgian citizens.

Education
Until the 19th century, young people from Abkhazia usually received their education mainly at religious schools (Muslims at madrasas and Christians at seminaries), although a small number of children from wealthy families had opportunity to travel to foreign countries for education. The first modern educational institutions (both schools and colleges) in Abkhazia were established in the late 19th-early 20th centuries and rapidly grew until the second half of the 20th century. by the middle of the 20th century, Sukhumi had become a home for large educational institutions (both higher education institutions and technical vocational education and training (TVET) colleges) and largest students' community in Abkhazia. For example, the number of college students grew from few dozens in the 1920s to several thousands in the 1980s.

According to the official statistical data, Abkhazia has 12 TVET colleges (as of 2019, est.) providing education and vocational training to youth mostly in the capital city, though there are several colleges in all major district centers. Independent international assessments suggest that these colleges train in about 20 different specialties attracting between 1000 and 1300 young people annually (aged between 16 and 29) (as of 2019, est.). The largest colleges are as follows:

 Abkhaz State University (1979), has its own campus which is a home for 42 departments organised into 8 faculties providing education to about 3300 students (as of 2019, est.).
 Abkhaz Multiindustrial College (1959) (from 1959 to 1999 – Sukhumi Trade and Culinary School),
 Sukhumi State College (1904) (from 1904 to 1921 – Sukhumi Real School; from 1921 to 1999 – Sukhumi Industrial Technical School),
 Sukhumi Art College (1935)
 Sukhum Medical College (1931)

Culture

The apsuara, the Abkhaz code of honor, is very stringent regarding hospitality. One of its principles is to respect guests even if these commit crimes against the host. 

The written Abkhaz literature appeared relatively recently, in the beginning of the 20th century. However, Abkhaz share the Nart sagas, a series of tales about mythical heroes, with other Caucasian peoples. The Abkhaz alphabet was created in the 19th century. The first newspaper in Abkhaz, called Abkhazia and edited by Dmitry Gulia, appeared in 1917.

Arguably the most famous Abkhaz writers are Fazil Iskander, who wrote mostly in Russian, and Bagrat Shinkuba, a poet and writer.

Sports

Football remains the most popular sport in Abkhazia. Other popular sports include basketball, boxing and wrestling. The National Basketball Team of Abkhazia played its first game with the Turkish Republic of Northern Cyprus Basketball team on 27 May 2015, which Abkhaz team won by 76–59. Abkhaz basketball team "Apsny" also plays in the Russian Basketball League's Third-Tier in Krasnodar Krai.
Abkhazia has had its own amateur football league called the Abkhazian Premier League, but it has no international football union membership. In total, there are nineteen Abkhazian Football Clubs across the two leagues. In 2016 it hosted and won the ConIFA World Football Cup.

Since the early 2000s, tennis has become increasingly popular among school age children in Abkhazia. Several tennis players from Sukhumi participated as the national competitions in Russia and played at major international competitions under the Russian flag. For example, tennis player Alen Avidzba participated at the Davis Cup in 2016 and Amina Anshba won a silver medal at an international tournament in Turkey in 2017. In fact, according to the official information from the Tennis portal.ru the highest career achievement of Amina Anshba was 278th place in the ranking among women in 2021

See also

 Outline of Abkhazia
 Bibliography of Abkhazia
 Community for Democracy and Rights of Nations
 Land of Darkness
 Law enforcement in Abkhazia
 Abkhazians of African descent
 Media in Abkhazia
 South Ossetia, another region of Georgia which is also a disputed territory
 Estonians in Abkhazia
 International recognition of Abkhazia and South Ossetia
 List of states with limited recognition

Notes

References

Sources
 
 Michael Lambert (2020). Consequences of the Diplomatic Recognition of Abkhazia by the Syrian Arab Republic (2018), Russian International Affairs Council

External links

 
 
 Crisis profile, Georgia, Abkhazia, S. Ossetia , from Reuters Alertnet .
  Официальный сайт Президента Республики Абхазия (official webpage of the President of Abkhazia).
  Ministry of Foreign Affairs of the Republic of Abkhazia (official site).
 BBC Regions and territories: Abkhazia
  State Information Agency of the Abkhaz Republic
 Abkhazia Provisional Paper Money
  Orthodox Churches of Abkhazia
  Rest in Abkhazia
  Archaeology and ethnography of Abkhazia, Abkhaz Institute of Social Studies, Abkhaz State Museum.
  Abkhazia Guide 
 Articles about Abkhazia in the Caucasus Analytical Digest No. 7

 
Autonomous republics of Georgia (country)
 
Frozen conflict zones
South Caucasus
Historical regions of Georgia (country)
Post-Soviet states
Russian-speaking countries and territories
Separatism in Georgia (country)
Western Asian countries
Western Asia
Eastern European countries
States with limited recognition